Smith Meade Purdy (July 31, 1796 – March 30, 1870) was an American lawyer and politician who served one term as a U.S. Representative from New York from 1843 to 1845.

Biography 
Born in North Norwich, New York, Purdy attended the common schools.
He studied law.
He was admitted to the bar and commenced practice at Sherburne, New York, in 1819.
He moved to Norwich, New York, in 1827 and continued the practice of law.
He was appointed judge of the court of common pleas and surrogate of Chenango County in 1833 and served until his resignation in 1837.

Congress 
Purdy was elected as a Democrat to the Twenty-eighth Congress (March 4, 1843 – March 3, 1845).
He was not a candidate for renomination in 1844.

Later career and death 
He resumed the practice of law.

Purdy was elected judge and surrogate of Chenango County in 1847 and served until 1851.
He declined a renomination owing to poor health and retired from active pursuits.

He died in Norwich, New York, March 30, 1870.
He was interred in Mount Hope Cemetery.

Sources

1796 births
1870 deaths
Democratic Party members of the United States House of Representatives from New York (state)
New York (state) state court judges
19th-century American politicians
19th-century American judges